King Cophetua and the Beggar Maid may refer to:

 The King and the Beggar-maid, a story
 King Cophetua and the Beggar Maid (painting), an 1884 painting by Edward Burne-Jones